"Wishing (If I Had a Photograph of You)" is a 1982 song by A Flock of Seagulls, the opening song and only hit single from their second album Listen.

Background
The song exemplifies "synth-pop's spaced-out loneliness" and yearning for imagined, absent lovers, and is noted for its Wall of Sound-styled layer of synthesizer padding – a "multi-layered, hypnotic song", according to AllMusic.

Formats 
 7" Jive 25 (UK) – 1982

 12" Jive T25 (UK) – 1982

 12" Jive VJ 12014 (US) – 1982

 CD August Day 41 (UK) – 2019

Chart and certifications 
Unlike the band's 1982 hit "I Ran (So Far Away)", largely a United States and Australian hit, "Wishing" performed strongly in the band's home country, the United Kingdom, and reached the top 10 of the UK Singles Chart; in the US, it reached the top 30 on the Billboard Hot 100 in mid-1983. It was popular in South Africa, reaching No. 8.

Weekly charts

Year-end charts

Certifications

References

Song recordings with Wall of Sound arrangements
1980s ballads
1982 singles
1982 songs
A Flock of Seagulls songs
Jive Records singles
Zomba Group of Companies singles
New wave ballads
Song recordings produced by Mike Howlett
Synth-pop ballads
Torch songs